Per-Erik "Pelle" Eklund (born 22 March 1963) is a Swedish former professional ice hockey winger who played nine seasons in the National Hockey League (NHL) with the Philadelphia Flyers and Dallas Stars and nine seasons in the Swedish Elitserien (SEL) with AIK and Leksands IF.

Playing career
Eklund played for AIK of the Elitserien between 1981 and 1985, winning the league championship in 1984. He quickly became one of the top players in the league, winning the Golden Puck as Sweden's top player in 1984 - one of the youngest winners ever at the age of only 21.

He came to the NHL in 1985, joining the Philadelphia Flyers who had selected him 161st overall in the 1983 NHL Entry Draft. He made an immediate impact, leading all rookies in assists with 51 and finishing 3rd in overall rookie scoring (behind only Kjell Dahlin and Gary Suter) in the 1985–86 season.

Over the next nine seasons, Eklund made a name for himself as a slick playmaking center, topping the 50 assist mark on three occasions. He was also noted for his gentlemanly play, always finishing amongst the least-penalized players in the NHL. The high point of his career came in the 1987 playoffs, when his outstanding play helped carry Philadelphia to the 1987 Stanley Cup Finals, as his 27 points were fourth in overall scoring and his 20 assists second to only Wayne Gretzky.

Eklund's scoring touch mysteriously disappeared in the 1993–94 season, as he recorded only one goal and 18 points in 48 games for the Flyers. At the trade deadline, he was dealt to the Dallas Stars, where he had a brief stint to finish his NHL career.

Eklund then returned to Sweden to play for Leksands IF for the 1994–95 season. He re-discovered his scoring touch in one of the finest seasons of his career, as he led the SEL in assists and points and was named league MVP. He played four more seasons for Leksand before retiring in 1999 at age 36.

In 2005–2006, he served as an assistant coach for Leksand. He served as a scout for the Montreal Canadiens until fired on 31 May 2010. Currently he is an amateur scout with the Edmonton Oilers.

International

Eklund played 126 international games for the Swedish national team.  He played in six IIHF World Championships and was on the gold medal Swedish team of 1991.  He played in the 1984 Winter Olympics on the Bronze medal team, and in the 1984 Canada Cup, in which Sweden made the finals.  He was also on the European Championships gold-medal team in 1990.

Awards
 Guldpucken Award (Golden Puck) as Sweden's player of the year in 1983–84
 Guldhjalmen Award (Golden Helmet) as the Most Valuable Player in the Elitserien in 1994–95
 1984 Elitserien All-Star Team
 top scorer in 1984 Elitserien playoffs

Career statistics

Regular season and playoffs

International

References

External links

 
 Meltzer, Bill "Flyers Heroes of the Past: Pelle Eklund" at Philadelphiaflyers.com

 

1963 births
Living people
AIK IF players
Dallas Stars players
Edmonton Oilers scouts
Ice hockey players at the 1984 Winter Olympics
Leksands IF players
Medalists at the 1984 Winter Olympics
Montreal Canadiens scouts
Olympic bronze medalists for Sweden
Olympic ice hockey players of Sweden
Olympic medalists in ice hockey
People from Solna Municipality
Philadelphia Flyers draft picks
Philadelphia Flyers players
Swedish expatriate ice hockey players in the United States
Swedish ice hockey forwards
Sportspeople from Stockholm County